I Heart California is the debut studio album by American indie rock band Admiral Radley, a collaboration of members from the bands Grandaddy and Earlimart. It was released on July 13, 2010, by record label The Ship.

Reception 

I Heart California received a generally mixed reception from critics. Phillip Cosores of Consequence of Sound called the album "a muddled mess of having too many cooks in the kitchen and no clear direction from a concept band with seemingly no real concept. Sure there are terrific moments, but by the end, one song stands out for it nearly self-aware statement 'it goes nowhere and it does nothing'."

Track listing

References

External links 

 
 I Heart California on Admiral Radley's official Bandcamp page

2010 albums